The Jersey City Medical Center is a hospital in Jersey City, New Jersey. The hospital has had different facilities in the city. It is currently located on a 15-acre campus at Grand Street and Jersey Avenue overlooking New York Harbor and Liberty State Park. The campus includes three facilities: the Wilzig Hospital, the Provident Bank Ambulatory Center, and the Christie Kerr Women's Health Center. The hospital serves as a regional referral and teaching hospital.

Jersey City Medical Center is a teaching affiliate and a member of Americas Essential Hospitals.

History
The hospital began as the "Charity Hospital" and was renamed the Jersey City Hospital in 1885. The formal dedication of the Medical Center Complex, the B. S. Pollack Hospital, was on October 2, 1936, with Franklin D. Roosevelt dedicating the building.

In addition to the surgery building and the maternity hospital, the campus included the nurses' residence (Murdoch Hall), hospital for chest diseases (Pollock), a psychiatric hospital, and an outpatient clinic. The Medical Center's services were free. During the 1950s, JCMC was the home of the medical school of Seton Hall University the predecessor to the New Jersey College of Medicine and Dentistry now located in Newark, NJ. The Art Deco buildings of the former JCMC complex were renovated and became The Beacon Jersey City.

Jersey City Medical Center was one of the first medical centers in the United States and the first in New Jersey. Many people in Northern New Jersey still call it “The Medical Center” because of its reputation to handle all kinds of medical issues. The hospital also has a teaching affiliation with the New York College of Osteopathic Medicine, and St. George's University School of Medicine.

In 2004, JCMC moved to new quarters at Grand Street and Jersey Avenue designed by Philadelphia A/E firm Ballinger and RBSD of New York. The site is near the light rail, ferries to NYC, PATH trains and the Liberty Science Center. The facility is currently operated by Barnabas Health and is the regions “state designated trauma center” and the only hospital (medical center) in Hudson County to do open heart surgery. Several additional buildings are currently being planned for the site.

Current operations
JCMC received among the highest scores in Hudson County in the New Jersey Department of Health's 2009 Hospital Performance Report. The Center scored in the top 10 percent of hospitals in the state for their care of heart attacks, surgical improvements, and heart failure, receiving the second-highest score behind North Bergen's Palisades Medical Center. JCMC received a 95 in pneumonia treatment, 97 in heart attack, heart failure and surgical care, percentages that represent the number of patients treated properly and released.

The JCMC comprises two main hospital facilities, the Wilzig Hospital (named after Siggi Wilzig) and the Provident Bank Ambulatory Center.

While not directly connected to the JCMC, a 2.5-acre parcel owned by the city is planned to become a proton therapy treatment center, though the deal is contingent on tax-abatements the city is reluctant to give.

In October 2012 the JCMC announced that it would implement an on-line appointment service for non-threatening emergency room treatment, becoming the first hospital in the New York metro area to do so.

Departments and centers

Behavioral Health Services

Inpatient Detoxification

Short-term acute private bed unit, led by a multi-disciplinary team. Patients receive a comprehensive assessment / care and discharge plan.

Psychiatric Emergency/ Screening

Located at the Jersey City Medical Center. Hudson County's designated Screening Center, offering six extended crisis evaluation beds, operates 24x7 providing psychiatric assessment and stabilization / referral as well as specialized psychiatric screening services for children, adolescents and adults.

Mobile Outreach

Located at the Jersey City Medical Center. Certified Screeners provide psychiatric screening in Hudson County and provide assistance with any trauma / emergency on a 24/7 basis. Outreach staff are stationed at the County Youth House, Jersey City Municipal Court and Hudson County Superior Court.

Acute Psychiatric and Detoxification Inpatient Care

Located at the Jersey City Medical Center. A psychiatric unit and detoxification unit are available 24x7. The closed acute section of the psychiatric unit is Hudson County's designated Short Term Facility. Admissions to the detoxification unit must meet ASAM criteria. A multi-disciplinary team provides a comprehensive assessment/treatment and discharge referral/linkage for all patients.

Partial Hospitalization Programs

Located at the Jersey City Medical Center. Day hospital services are available for children, adolescents, and adults. A Therapeutic Nursery is available for 3-5 year olds. Day and after-school partial hospital programs are available for children/adolescents with a serious emotional disorder. Two-day programs are available for adults: an Acute Partial Hospitalization Program for individuals being discharged from acute hospital stays as well as those needing a higher level of care to divert them from hospitalization, and a psychosocial rehabilitation program with specialized services for MICA patients.

Outpatient Programs

Located at the Jersey City Medical Center. A full range of services, individual, group, marital, family, psychological testing, and medication management are available for children, adolescents and adults who present with emotional, psychiatric, behavioral, interpersonal, or post traumatic issues. Anger management and Domestic Violence groups are available for men and women. Addiction treatment services and drug testing/monitoring are available for adults, including intensive outpatient groups, and after care. A School Based Clinic at Snyder High School provides onsite counseling services.

Integrated Case Management Services

Located at the Jersey City Medical Center. Hudson County's designated ICMS provider is available for Hudson County adults who have a serious psychiatric disorder and require assertive community outreach to assist with community stabilization.

Residential Services

Located at the Jersey City Medical Center. A 24x7 supervised 15 bed specialized residence, Liberty Park Residence, is available for long-term care for seriously disabled adults. A Supportive Housing Project assists adults with a psychiatric problem who want to live independently but require assistance.

Consultation and Education/ Traumatic Loss Program

Located at the Jersey City Medical Center.

Fannie E. Rippel Foundation Heart Institute
Cardiac services including:
 Angioplasty
 Diagnostic Cardiac Catheterization
 Echocardiograms
 Stress Testing
 Tilt Table
 Nuclear Medicine
 64-slice CT Scan
 Intravascular Ultrasound
 Percutaneous Coronary Intervention
 Pacemaker & Implantable Cardioverter
 Defibrillator (ICD) Therapy
 Minimally Invasive Vein Harvesting
 Revascularization including on and off pump
 MAZE Procedure
 Aneurysm Surgery
 Mitral Valve Repair and Replacement

Additionally, this institute is the only center in Hudson County that provides:
 Cardiac Catheterization & Cardiac Surgery Center for the Diagnosis & Treatment of Cardiac Disorders
 Fully Licensed Angioplasty Program
 Full-Service Cardiac Surgery Program

Jersey City Medical Center at Greenville
Opened in 2019 at the former Greenville Hospital on Kennedy Boulvard in Greenville. The facility began as a small outpatient dispensary in 1898. The current building was completed in 1964, with a west wing added in 1971. The hospital became part of Liberty HealthCare System, the former JCMC parent, in 1990. After it closed, the building was used for two years as headquarters for Jersey City Medical Center's Emergency Medical Service. The building was later sold to Community Healthcare Associates, which renovated it and leased it back to the JCMC.

The Orthopedic Institute at Jersey City Medical Center

Jersey City Emergency Medical Services

History
1868 – Charity Hospital was Built in Jersey City

1882 – Jersey City Medical Center Moved to Montgomery and Baldwin

1883 – JCMC EMS Responded to 691 EMS Calls

1916 – JCMC EMS Responds to Black Tom Explosion

1919 – JCMC EMS begins utilizing Motorized Ambulances

1930 – JCMC EMS maintains a fleet of 11 ambulances and responds to a record 17,000 requests for aid

1978 – JCMC EMS is one of the nine original paramedic projects in New Jersey

1996 – Achieved Accreditation by the State of New Jersey for the EMT training program

2003 – Partnered with Hudson County Community College to establish an associate degree program in Pre-Hospital Medicine: Paramedic Science

2005 & 2007 – The American Heart Association Training Center successfully obtained American Heart Association accreditation in BLS, PALS, and ACLS

2006 – Implemented real time driver feedback system, Implemented nationally recognized System Status Management GPS Deployment Strategy

2007 – Designed the first in New Jersey "HeartSafe and Emergency Ready Communities", Implemented Electronic Scheduling

2008 – Created Operational Dashboard Reporting, Deployed MARVLIS system

2009 – Implemented electronic charting system, Began the process of certifying EMS Billing Employees through the National Academy of Ambulance Coding

2010 – Achieved Accreditation from the Commission on Accreditation of Ambulance Services (CAAS), Achieved Accreditation by the Commission of Accreditation of Allied Health Education Programs (CAAHEP), Achieved 
Accredited Center of Excellence from the National Academy of Emergency Dispatch, Jersey City Medical Center EMS Department maintains a fleet of 35 emergency vehicles and responds to more than 90,000 incidents a year

Hospital rating data
The HealthGrades website contains the clinical quality data for Jersey City Medical Center, as of 2018. For this rating section clinical quality rating data, patient safety ratings and patient experience ratings are presented.

For inpatient conditions and procedures, there are three possible ratings: worse than expected, as expected, better than expected.  For this hospital the data for this category is:
Worse than expected - 5
As expected - 20
Better than expected - 2

For patient safety ratings the same three possible ratings are used. For this hospital they are"
Worse than expected - 2
As expected - 11
Better than expected - 0

Percentage of patients rating this hospital as a 9 or 10 - 67%
Percentage of patients who on average rank hospitals as a 9 or 10 - 69%

See also
 Seton Hall University

References

External links

Jersey City history
Liberty Health

Hospital buildings completed in 1909
Hospital buildings completed in 1931
Hospital buildings completed in 1936
Hospitals in Hudson County, New Jersey
Buildings and structures in Jersey City, New Jersey
Teaching hospitals in New Jersey
Trauma centers